was a village located in Taki District, Mie Prefecture, Japan.

As of 2003, the village had an estimated population of 3,953 and a density of 12.85 persons per km². The total area was 307.54 km².

On January 10, 2006 Miyagawa was merged into the expanded town of Ōdai and thus no longer exists as an independent municipality.

External links
 Official website of Ōdai 

Dissolved municipalities of Mie Prefecture